Star Streak refers to

 a British ultralight aircraf, see CFM_Shadow#Design_and_development
 a British short-range man-portable air-defence system, see Starstreak